Pedda thandrapadu is a village in Rajoli mandal, Alampure taluq and jogulamba gadwal district, Telangana state, India. area population of 350000 people.pincode 509135

References

Villages in Jogulamba Gadwal district

Jogulamba gadwal-geo-stub